Do-yeong, Do-young, or Do-yong, is a Korean unisex given name. The meaning differs based on the hanja used to write each syllable of the name. There are 44 hanja with the reading "Do" and 34 hanja with the reading "Yeong" on the South Korean government's official list of hanja which may be registered for use in given names.

People with this name include:

 Chang Do-yong (1923–2012), South Korean politician
 Park Do-yeong (born 1993), South Korean speed skater
 Seo Do-young (born 1981), South Korean actor
 Song Do-yeong (born 1951), South Korean voice actress
 Doyoung (birth name Kim Dong-young, born 1996), South Korean singer, member of NCT
 Kang Full (birth name Kang Do-young, born 1974), South Korean webtoon artist

See also
 List of Korean given names

References

Korean unisex given names